The North Fork River or the North Fork of White River is a  tributary of the White River, into which it flows near Norfork, Arkansas.

It rises in the southwest corner of Texas County, at the southeast margin the city of Mountain Grove, and flows generally southwards through the southwest corner of Texas, eastern Douglas and Ozark counties.  It flows through Mark Twain National Forest and gathers the waters of many streams, including its major tributary, Bryant Creek. The watershed includes major portions of eastern Douglas and Ozark counties and includes portions of Webster, Wright, Texas and Howell counties in Missouri.

South of Tecumseh, Missouri, the river becomes Norfork Lake, a reservoir created by Norfork Dam in Baxter County, Arkansas.  A few miles below the dam, the North Fork River joins the White River near the town of Norfork, Arkansas. The part of the river below the Norfork Dam is called the Norfork Tailwater and is a trout fishing stream.

References

External links 
 Norfork Lake Chamber of Commerce
 Map of the North Fork watershed
 Map of Bryant Creek watershed, major tributary of the North Fork

Rivers of Missouri
Rivers of Arkansas
Bodies of water of the Ozarks
Tributaries of the White River (Arkansas–Missouri)
Rivers of Baxter County, Arkansas
Rivers of Texas County, Missouri
Rivers of Douglas County, Missouri
Rivers of Ozark County, Missouri
Ozarks